Kosmos 124 ( meaning Cosmos 124) or Zenit-2 No.42 was a Soviet, first generation, low resolution, optical film-return reconnaissance satellite launched in 1966.

Kosmos 124 was launched by a Voskhod 11A57 rocket with serial number N15001-14, flying from Site 31/6 at the Baikonur Cosmodrome. The launch took place at 10:33 GMT on 14 July 1966, and following its successful arrival in orbit the spacecraft received its Kosmos designation; along with the International Designator 1966-064A and the Satellite Catalog Number 02325.

After eight days in orbit, Kosmos 124 was deorbited, with its return capsule descending under parachute, landing at 09:22 GMT on 22 July 1966, and recovered by Soviet force.

References

Kosmos satellites
Spacecraft launched in 1966
Spacecraft which reentered in 1966
Zenit-2 satellites
1966 in the Soviet Union